The Complete Town Hall Concert is a live album by the American bassist, composer and bandleader Charles Mingus, recorded at The Town Hall in New York City and first released on the United Artists label in 1962 as Town Hall Concert. The album was rereleased with additional tracks on the Blue Note label in 1994 as The Complete Town Hall Concert. 

The concert was originally conceived as a "live workshop" of newly composed music which would be recorded for release by United Artists but rescheduling, lack of rehearsal time, poor sound and interruptions led to the event and subsequent album being considered a disaster. Much of the music intended for the concert/recording was finally realized by conductor Gunther Schuller in a concert in 1989 as Epitaph.

Reception
The AllMusic review by Scott Yanow stated: "Charles Mingus's Town Hall Concert has long been considered a famous fiasco, and the original United Artists LP (which contained just 36 minutes of music and did not bother identifying the personnel) made matters worse. But this 1994 Blue Note CD does its best to clean up the mess".

Track listing
All compositions by Charles Mingus except as indicated
 "Freedom Part 1" - 3:47    
 "Freedom Part 2" - 3:14    
 "Osmotin'" - 2:50 Bonus track on CD reissue    
 "Epitaph Part 1" - 7:03    
 "Peggy's Blue Skylight" - 5:21 Bonus track on CD reissue     
 "Epitaph Part 2" - 5:10    
 "My Search" - 8:09    
 "Portrait" - 4:34 Bonus track on CD reissue      
 "Duke's Choice" - 5:12    
 "Please Don't Come Back from the Moon" - 7:24 Bonus track on CD reissue     
 "In a Mellow Tone" (Duke Ellington, Milt Gabler) - 8:21    
 "Epitaph Part 1" [alternate take] - 7:23 Bonus track on CD reissue

Personnel
Charles Mingus - bass, narration
Ed Armour, Rolf Ericson, Lonnie Hillyer, Ernie Royal, Clark Terry, Richard Williams, Snooky Young - trumpet
Eddie Bert, Jimmy Cleveland, Willie Dennis, Paul Faulise, Quentin Jackson, Britt Woodman - trombone
Romeo Penque - oboe
Danny Bank - bass clarinet
Buddy Collette, Eric Dolphy, Charlie Mariano, Charles McPherson - alto saxophone
George Berg, Zoot Sims - tenor saxophone
Pepper Adams, Jerome Richardson - baritone saxophone
Warren Smith - vibraphone, percussion
Toshiko Akiyoshi, Jaki Byard – piano
Les Spann - guitar
Milt Hinton - bass
Dannie Richmond - drums
Grady Tate - percussion
Bob Hammer, Gene Roland - arranger
Melba Liston - arranger, conductor

References

1962 live albums
United Artists Records live albums
Blue Note Records live albums
Charles Mingus live albums
Albums recorded at the Town Hall